Sir Rupert Malise Speir (10 September 1910 – 16 September 1998) was a British Conservative Party politician.

He was born at East Saltoun in East Lothian, Scotland, and educated at Eton College and at Pembroke College, Cambridge, where he was chairman of the Cambridge University Conservative Association. He became a solicitor, and in 1939 he joined the army, where he served in the Intelligence Corps throughout the Second World War.

At the 1945 general election, he stood unsuccessfully as the Conservative candidate in the safe Labour seat of Linlithgowshire in Scotland, winning 36% of the votes.  He was unsuccessful again at the 1950 general election.

At the 1951 general election he was elected as Member of Parliament (MP) for Hexham, and held the seat until he retired at the 1966 general election.

Three private members bills sponsored by Speir were passed into law: the Litter Act 1958, the Noise Abatement Act 1960 and the Local Government (Financial Provisions) Act 1963.

References
Obituary, The Independent, 24 September 1998 by Patrick Cosgrave

External links 
 

1910 births
1998 deaths
English solicitors
Intelligence Corps officers
People educated at Eton College
Alumni of Pembroke College, Cambridge
Conservative Party (UK) MPs for English constituencies
Speakers of the House of Commons of the United Kingdom
UK MPs 1951–1955
UK MPs 1955–1959
UK MPs 1959–1964
UK MPs 1964–1966
Knights Bachelor
British Army personnel of World War II
People from East Lothian
People educated at West Downs School
20th-century English lawyers